Rubidium nitrate is an inorganic compound with the formula RbNO3.  This alkali metal nitrate salt is white and highly soluble in water.

Properties

Rubidium nitrate is a white crystalline powder that is highly soluble in water and very slightly soluble in acetone.  In a flame test, RbNO3 gives a mauve/light purple colour.

Uses
Rubidium compounds have very few applications. Like caesium nitrate, it is used in infrared radiation optics, in pyrotechnic compositions as a pyrotechnic colorant and as an oxidizer, e.g. in decoys and illumination flares although it is rarely used in fireworks to produce a red-violet colour. It is also used as a raw material for preparation of other rubidium compounds and rubidium metal, for manufacture of catalysts and in scintillation counters.

Production
RbNO3 can be prepared either by dissolving rubidium metal, its hydroxide or carbonate in nitric acid.

RbOH + HNO3   →   RbNO3  +  H2O
2 Rb  +  2 HNO3  →  2 RbNO3 + H2

References

Rubidium compounds
Nitrates
Pyrotechnic oxidizers
Pyrotechnic colorants